Olympic Park is a subway station on Seoul Subway Line 5 and Seoul Subway Line 9 in Songpa-gu, Seoul. It became an interchange with Subway Line 9 on December 1, 2018.

Station layout

Line 5

Line 9

Gallery

References

Railway stations opened in 1996
Seoul Metropolitan Subway stations
Metro stations in Songpa District
Olympic Park, Seoul
1996 establishments in South Korea
20th-century architecture in South Korea